"Mystery Girl" is the first and second episodes of the third season of the television series The Naked Brothers Band which premiered on October 18, 2008 on Nickelodeon. The episode is in the format of a rockumentary-mockumentary musical episode. This episode was the highest rated Naked Brothers Band episode ever with more than 4 million viewers.

Plot
The Naked Brothers Band begin filming a motion picture called The Top Secret Naked Brothers Band Musical Mystery Movie. Nat tries to grapple why Rosalina is trying to get herself written out of the script.

To Nat's dismay, he later discovers that Rosalina is going to leave for a 6-month boat cruise around the world for winning a violin competition and becomes mad at her. Meanwhile, Alex freaks when he finds out that he has to kiss his skateboarding buddy, Juanita (Teala Dunn), for a scene in the film.

During the time Nat is moping around, he develops feelings for his costar, the renowned actress Miranda Cosgrove, and he feels confused after kissing her for a scene in the movie. After that, Miranda suggested that Nat should do something very nice for Rosalina, before she leaves for the cruise.

Nat finally accepts that Rosalina is leaving and decides to perform a serenade for her with the band, by singing her his self-written composition, "Your Smile", outside of her apartment. In conclusion, in the subplots, Cooper becomes the new director of the movie, and Juanita did not have to kiss Alex—as it was only a typo by the screenwriter; instead Juanita only has to kick him.

Cast

Main cast
 Nat Wolff as himself
 Alex Wolff as himself
 Thomas Batuello as himself
 Allie DiMeco as Rosalina
 David Levi as himself
 Qaasim Middleton as himself
 Cooper Pillot as himself
 Jesse Draper as Jesse Cook
 Michael Wolff as Dad (Mr. Wolff)

Special guest appearance
Miranda Cosgrove as herself

Guest starring
 Andrew Keenan-Bolger as Christophe
 Randy Blair as Benny
 Mimi Lieber as Choreographer

Discography

References

External links
 
 
 'Quiet on the Set' at Scholastic News

2008 American television episodes
The Naked Brothers Band (TV series) episodes